Richard Thomas Parker (1834 - 10 August 1864) was an English murderer who was the last person to be publicly executed in Nottingham.

Life

He was christened in Thurgarton on 26 October 1834.

Richard Thomas Parker of Fiskerton, a butcher, was publicly declared bankrupt in November, 1862 at Newark.

After a drunken row with Samuel Parker, his father, at their home in Fiskerton in Nottinghamshire, Parker shot his father and his mother, Elizabeth Parker, formerly Miss Tutbury. Parker's father survived, but his mother lingered on for several weeks and died on 16 May 1864 .

Parker was tried at Nottingham Crown Court sitting at Shire Hall, Nottingham starting on Monday 25 July 1864, in front of Mr Justice Blackburn. He was found guilty of wilful murder by the jury.

He was  condemned to death. His execution was held publicly on the steps of the Shire Hall. Richard Charles Sutton, a local architect, was charged with the scaffold arrangements.

A large crowd estimated at 10,000 gathered on High Pavement to watch the execution. The scaffold was surrounded by boarding 4 feet high to prevent the public seeing the prisoner after the drop.

The acting under-sheriff Mr JT Brewster, the chaplain, Reverend W Howard, the prisoner and the hangman appeared on the scaffold at 8:00 am. As the chaplain uttered the words "In the midst of life we are in death" the bolt was drawn and Parker hung.

After hanging on the gallows for an hour, the body was cut down and buried.

References

1834 births
1864 deaths
19th-century English criminals
Executed people from Nottinghamshire
19th-century executions by England and Wales
1864 murders in the United Kingdom
Matricides